The Santa Fe Trail was a 19th-century route through central North America that connected Franklin, Missouri, with Santa Fe, New Mexico. Pioneered in 1821 by William Becknell, who departed from the Boonslick region along the Missouri River, the trail served as a vital commercial highway until 1880, when the railroad arrived in Santa Fe. Santa Fe was near the end of El Camino Real de Tierra Adentro which carried trade from Mexico City. The trail was later incorporated into parts of the National Old Trails Road and U.S. Route 66.

The route skirted the northern edge and crossed the north-western corner of Comancheria, the territory of the Comanche. Realizing the value, they demanded compensation for granting passage to the trail. American traders envisioned them as another market. Comanche raiding farther south in Mexico isolated New Mexico, making it more dependent on the American trade. They raided to gain a steady supply of horses to sell. By the 1840s, trail traffic through the Arkansas Valley was so numerous that bison herds were cut off from important seasonal grazing land. This habitat disruption, on top of overhunting, contributed to the collapse of the species. Comanche power declined in the region when they lost their most important game.

In 1846, during the Mexican–American War, the United States Army used the Santa Fe Trail to invade New Mexico.

After the U.S. acquisition of the Southwest that ended the war, the trail was integral to the U.S. opening the region to economic development and settlement. It played a vital role in the westward expansion of the U.S. into these new lands. The road route is commemorated today by the National Park Service as the Santa Fe National Historic Trail. A highway route that roughly follows the trail's path, through the entire length of Kansas, the southeast corner of Colorado and northern New Mexico, has been designated as the Santa Fe Trail National Scenic Byway.

History

The Santa Fe Trail was a transportation route opened by the Indians as well as European trappers and traders in the second half of the 18th century. It was later used extensively by people from the United States in the 19th century after the Louisiana Purchase. Traders and settlers crossed the southwest of North America by the route connecting Independence, Missouri, with Santa Fe, New Mexico. Its major market in Missouri was St. Louis, with its port on the Mississippi River.

In 1719, the French officer Claude Charles Du Tisne was tasked by french authorities to establish a route to trade with the Spanish colony of Santa Fe in New Mexico. This first expedition, which started in Kaskaskia, Illinois, failed, as it was stopped by Indian tribes in Kansas. Then, at the time of the Louisiana regime, under French and then Spanish sovereignty, the French traders Pierre Antoine and Paul Mallet made a first trip in 1739 and 1740, starting also from Kaskaskia, Illinois, reaching Santa Fe and returning. They made other expeditions in 1741 and 1750, which faced various challenges from Indians and Spaniards. Then, the French explorer Pierre Vial made another pioneering trip on the route in 1792, and French traders and trappers from St. Louis gained progressively a fur trading dominance from the Spanish in Santa Fe as well as with the Indian tribes living in this vast region. Other French traders and trappers made trips on the trail from St. Louis, such as Auguste Pierre Chouteau and Jules de Mun in 1815, who were arrested by  Spanish authorities in Santa Fe.

After Louisiana was sold to the United States in 1803 (Louisiana Purchase), Americans improved and publicized the Santa Fe Trail beginning in 1822, in order to take advantage of new trade opportunities with Mexico which had just won independence from Spain in the Mexican War of Independence. Manufactured goods were hauled from Missouri to Santa Fe, which was then in the northern Mexican state of Nuevo Mexico.

Settlers seeking the opportunity to hold free land used wagon trains to follow various emigrant trails that branched off to points west. The political philosophy of manifest destiny, the idea that the U.S. should extend from one coast to another, dominated national political discussions. The trail connected interior port cities along the Mississippi and Missouri and their wagon train outfitters to western destinations. The trail was used to carry products from the central plains to the trail head towns St. Joseph and Independence, Missouri.

In the 1820s–1830s, it was also sporadically important in the reverse trade, used by traders to transport foods and supplies to the fur trappers and mountain men opening the remote Northwest, especially in the interior Northwest: Idaho, Wyoming, Colorado, and Montana. A mule trail (trapper's trails) led to points north to supply the lucrative overland fur trade in ports on the Pacific Coast.

North–South trade
Santa Fe was near the northern terminus of El Camino Real de Tierra Adentro, which led overland between Mexico City to San Juan Pueblo, New Mexico.

Cargo mule trains were run from Fort Bernard in Wyoming to the Santa Fe Trail at Fort Bent in Colorado .

Importance of Santa Fe

In 1825, the merchant Manuel Escudero of Chihuahua was commissioned by New Mexico governor Bartolome Baca to negotiate in Washington, D.C. for opening U.S. borders to traders from Mexico. Beginning in 1826, prominent aristocratic families of New Mexicans, such as the Chávezes, Armijos, Pereas, and Oteros, entered into the commerce along the trail. By 1843, traders from New Mexico and Chihuahua had become the majority of traders involved in the traffic of goods over the Santa Fe Trail.

In 1835, Mexico City had sent Albino Pérez to govern the department of New Mexico as Jefe Politico (political chief or governor) and as commanding military officer.  In 1837, the forces of Rio Arriba (the upper Rio Grande, i.e., northern New Mexico) rebelled against Pérez's enforcement of the recent Mexican constitution, new revenue laws taxing Santa Fe commerce and entertainment, and the large grants of New Mexico land to wealthy Mexicans. New Mexicans appreciated the relative freedoms of a frontier, remote from Mexico City. The rebels defeated and executed governor Albino Perez, but were later ousted by the forces of Rio Abajo (the lower Rio Grande, or southern New Mexico) led by Manuel Armijo.

Conflict between Texas and Mexico
The Republic of Texas competed with Mexico in claiming Santa Fe, as part of the territory north and east of the Rio Grande which both nations claimed following  Texas's secession from Mexico in 1836.

In 1841, a small military and trading expedition departed from Austin, Texas for Santa Fe. They represented the Republic of Texas and its president Mirabeau B. Lamar. Their intention was to persuade the people of Santa Fe and New Mexico to relinquish control over the territory under dispute with Mexico, and over associated Santa Fe Trail commerce. Knowing about recent political disturbances there, they hoped for a welcome by the rebellious faction in New Mexico. What was known as the Texan Santa Fe Expedition encountered many difficulties. The party was captured by governor Armijo's Mexican army under less than honest negotiations. They were subjected to harsh and austere treatment during a tortuous forced march to Mexico City, where they were tried, convicted and imprisoned for their insurgent activities.

In 1842, Colonel William A. Christy wrote Sam Houston, president of Texas, requesting support for an overthrow scheme by Charles Warfield dependent on armed forces. He proposed deposing the governments in the Mexican provinces of New Mexico and Chihuahua and returning half of the spoils to the Republic of Texas. Houston agreed, provided the operation be conducted under the strictest secrecy.

He commissioned Warfield as a colonel, who attempted to raise volunteers in Texas, St. Louis, Missouri; and the southern Rockies for a Warfield Expedition. He recruited John McDaniel and a small band of men in the proximate vicinity of St. Louis, giving McDaniel the rank of a Texas captain. After Warfield headed toward the Rockies with a companion, McDaniel led a robbery in April 1843 (in present-day Rice County, Kansas) of a lightly defended Santa Fe Trail trading caravan. This resulted in the murder of its leader Antonio José Chávez, the son of a former governor of New Mexico, Francisco Xavier Chávez.

Warfield was reportedly unaware of the crime. McDaniel and one accomplice were tried, convicted and executed. Other participating suspects arrested by the U.S. were convicted and imprisoned. The newspapers reported that Americans and Mexicans were outraged by the crime. Local merchants and citizens at the U.S. end of the Santa Fe Trail demanded justice and a return to the stable commerce which their economy depended on.

After the murder of Chávez, Warfield began limited military hostilities in the region using recruits from the southern Rockies. He made an unprovoked attack on Mexican troops outside Mora, New Mexico, leaving five dead. Warfield lost his horses after an encounter in Wagon Mound, where the Mexican forces had made chase. After Warfield's men reached Bent's Fort on foot, they disbanded.

In February 1843, Colonel Jacob Snively had received a commission to intercept Mexican caravans along the Santa Fe Trail, similar to that received by Warfield the year prior. After disbanding the volunteers under his command, Warfield located and joined the 190-man, Texas "Battalion of Invincibles," under the command of Snively. New Mexico Governor Manuel Armijo led Mexican troops out of Santa Fe to protect incoming caravans. But, after the Invincibles destroyed much of an advance party led by Captain Ventura Lovato, the governor retreated. Following this battle, many Americans  resigned and Snively's force was reduced to little over 100 men. Snively planned to plunder Mexican merchant caravans on territory claimed by Texas, in retaliation for recent Texian executions and Mexican invasions, but his battalion was quickly arrested and disarmed by the US troops escorting the caravans. After disarming these men, Captain Philip St. George Cooke allowed them to return to Texas.

Mother of the railroad

In 1863, with all the political bickering over railroad legislation, entrepreneurs opened their pockets and set their sights on the American Southwest leading to the gradual construction east to west of the Atchison, Topeka and Santa Fe Railway; the name eponymously reflecting the intentions of the founders, the expected eastern terminus to be in Atchison, Kansas.

Inside Kansas, the AT&SF roadbed roughly paralleled the Santa Fe Trail west of Topeka as it expanded between 1868 and 1874. When a railroad bridge was built across the Missouri River to connect eastern markets to the Dodge City cattle trail and Colorado coal mines, the railroad spurred the growth of Kansas City, Missouri.  Building the railway so that it extended westwards to destinations in and beyond the New Mexico border was delayed and kept the fledgling railroad gasping for cash. In a move to bootstrap their own base market, the railway began offering packaged "Shopping Excursion deals" to potential buyers desiring to look over a real estate parcel. The railroad began to discount such trips to visit its land offices and gave back the ticket price as part of the purchase price, if a sale was concluded.

The railroad's sale of its land granted by congress fostered growth of new towns and businesses along its route, which generated railway traffic and revenues. With this financial base, the railway extended west, gradually adding new connections through rougher west country along the western Trail. With the development of rail transport, traffic on the Trail soon dropped to merely local trade. In a sense, after World War I the trail was reborn; by the 1920s it gradually became paved automobile roads.

Route

The eastern end of the trail was in the central Missouri town of Franklin on the north bank of the Missouri River. The route across Missouri first used by Becknell followed portions of the existing Osage Trace and the Medicine Trails. West of Franklin, the trail crossed the Missouri near Arrow Rock, after which it followed roughly the route of present-day U.S. Route 24. It passed north of Marshall, through Lexington to Fort Osage, then to Independence. Independence was also one of the historic "jumping off points" for the Oregon and California Trails.

West of Independence, it roughly followed the route of U.S. Route 56 from near the town of Olathe to the western border of Kansas. It enters Colorado, cutting across the southeast corner of the state before entering New Mexico. The section of the trail between Independence and Olathe was also used by immigrants on the California and Oregon Trails, which branched off to the northwest near Gardner, Kansas.

From Olathe, the trail passed through the towns of Baldwin City, Burlingame, and Council Grove, then swung west of McPherson to the town of Lyons. West of Lyons the trail followed nearly the route of present-day Highway 56 to Great Bend. At Great Bend, the trail encountered the Arkansas River. Branches of the trail followed both sides of the river upstream to Dodge City  and Garden City.

West of Garden City in southwestern Kansas the trail splits into two branches. One of the branches, called the Mountain Route or the Upper Crossing follows the Purgatoire River from La Junta upstream to Trinidad then south through the Raton Pass into New Mexico.

The other main branch, called the Cimarron Cutoff or Cimarron Crossing or Middle Crossing cut southwest across the Cimarron Desert (also known as the Waterscrape or La Jornada) to the valley of the Cimarron River near the town of Ulysses and Elkhart then continued toward Boise City, Oklahoma, to Clayton, New Mexico, joining up with northern branch at Fort Union. This route was generally very hazardous because it had very little water. In fact, the Cimarron River was one of the only sources of water along this branch of the trail.

From Watrous, the reunited branches continued southward to Santa Fe. Part of this route has been designated a National Scenic Byway.

Challenges

Travelers faced many hardships along the Santa Fe Trail. The trail was a challenging  of dangerous plains, hot deserts, and steep and rocky mountains. The natural weather was and is continental: very hot and dry summers, coupled with long and bitterly cold winters. Fresh water was scarce, and the high steppe-like plains are nearly treeless. Water flows in the Pecos, Arkansas, Cimarron, and Canadian rivers that drain the region vary by 90 or more percent in their flows during an average year. Also on this trail, unlike the Oregon Trail, there was a serious danger of Indian attacks, for neither the Comanche nor the Apache of the southern high plains tolerated trespassers. In 1825, Congress voted for federal protection for the Santa Fe Trail, even though much of it lay in the Mexican territory. Lack of food and water also made the trail very risky. Weather conditions, like huge lightning storms, gave the travelers even more difficulty. If a storm developed, there was often no place to take shelter and the livestock could get spooked. Rattlesnakes often posed a threat, and many people died due to snakebites. The caravan size increased later on to prevent Indian raids. The travelers also harnessed more oxen instead of mules—primarily for the greater hauling power of oxen but also because they were less valued by Indians and thus less risk of being raided.

Historic preservation
Segments of this trail in Missouri, Kansas, Oklahoma, and New Mexico are listed on the National Register of Historic Places. In Missouri, this includes the 85th and Manchester "Three Trails" Trail Segment, Arrow Rock Ferry Landing, Santa Fe Trail – Grand Pass Trail Segments, and Santa Fe Trail – Saline County Trail Segments. The longest clearly identifiable section of the trail, Santa Fe Trail Remains, near Dodge City, Kansas, is listed as a National Historic Landmark. In Colorado, Santa Fe Trail Mountain Route – Bent's New Fort is included on the National Register.

Notable features 

Missouri
 Arrow Rock (Arrow Rock Landing, Santa Fe Spring, Huston Tavern)
 Harvey Spring/Weinrich Ruts
 Independence (Santa Fe trail Ruts, Lower Independence (Blue Mills) Landing, Upper Independence (Wayne City) Landing.
 Kansas City (Westport Landing)

Kansas
 Kansas City (Shawnee Mission, Big Blue River Crossing)
 Council Grove (Kaw Mission, Neosho River Crossing, Hermit's Cave, Last Chance Store, Council Oak, Post Office Oak)
 Fort Larned National Historic Site
 Fort Dodge (Jackson's Grove and Island, Santa Fe Trail Ruts, Middle Crossing, Point of Rocks, Fort Atkinson Site)

Mountain Route towards Colorado
 Arkansas River Crossing

Colorado
Mountain Route
 Bent's Old Fort National Historic Site
 Raton Pass

Cimarron Route thru Kansas towards Oklahoma
 Cimarron River
 Cimarron National Grassland

New Mexico
Mountain Route
 Clifton House
 Cimarron (Aztec Mill, Cimarron Plaza and Well)
 Philmont Scout Ranch

Cimarron Route
 Kiowa National Grassland

Joint route
 Fort Union National Monument
 Pecos National Historical Park
 Santa Fe
 De Vargas Street House, Oldest House in the United States
 Northern Rio Grande National Heritage Area

See also
 MO: Jackson County Historic Places
 KS: Johnson County Historic Places
 OK: Cimarron County Historic Places
 NM: Colfax County Historic Places
 Oregon-California Trails Association
 Pawnee Rock
 Related National Park Units
 Fort Larned National Historic Site
 Bent's Old Fort National Historic Site
 Fort Union National Monument
 Santa Fe Trail Remains
 Santa Fe Trail Museum, part of the Trinidad History Museum
 Santa Fe Trail Historical Park in El Monte, California
 Trailside Center museum in Kansas City, Missouri
 Scenic byways in the United States
 Tree in the Trail

References

Further reading
  224 pages.
  208 pages.
  252 pages.
  272 pages.
  168 pages.
  162 pages.
  190 pages.
 ;318 pages.
  320 pages.
  287 pages.

 Maps
  196 pages.
  121 pages.
  21 pages.

External links

The Great Prairie Highway (National Park Service)
Santa Fe Trail at Pecos National Park (National Park Service)
Santa Fe Trail Center
 Santa Fe Trail Research
 Santa Fe Trail Research Site Aerial Photo Tour of the Santa Fe Trail
 Access documents, photographs, and other primary sources on Kansas Memory, the Kansas State Historical Society's digital portal
 New Mexico Santa Fe Trail National Scenic Byway
Glorieta and Raton Passes: Gateways to the Southwest, a National Park Service Teaching with Historic Places (TwHP) lesson plan
Pioneer Trails from US Land Surveys
 Oklahoma Digital Maps: Digital Collections of Oklahoma and Indian Territory

 
Roads on the National Register of Historic Places in Colorado
Roads on the National Register of Historic Places in Missouri
Roads on the National Register of Historic Places in New Mexico
Roads on the National Register of Historic Places in Oklahoma
Historic trails and roads in New Mexico
Historic trails and roads in Colorado
Historic trails and roads in Kansas
Historic trails and roads in Missouri
Historic trails and roads in Oklahoma
Native American trails in the United States
Trails and roads in the American Old West
Colorado Territory
Jefferson Territory
New Mexico Territory
New Mexico Scenic and Historic Byways
1822 establishments in the United States
National Historic Trails of the United States
Native American history of Colorado
Native American history of New Mexico
Native American history of Kansas
Native American history of Missouri
Native American history of Oklahoma